John Marshall (fl. 1384–1392), of Cambridge, was an English politician.

He was a Member (MP) of the Parliament of England for Cambridge in April 1384 and September 1388. He was mayor of Cambridge from September 1391 to 1392.

References

Year of birth missing
Year of death missing
English MPs April 1384
People from Cambridge
Mayors of Cambridge
English MPs September 1388